LG is a South Korean electronics and petrochemicals conglomerate. LG or lg may also refer to:

Arts and entertainment
 Lawful Good, an alignment in the role-playing game Dungeons & Dragons
 Living Greyhawk, a popular Dungeons & Dragons campaign
 Lockhart & Gardner, a fictional law firm on the US TV series The Good Wife (season 5)

Businesses and organizations
 LG Electronics, an affiliate of the South Korean LG Group which produces electronic products
 Laclede Group (NYSE stock symbol LG)
 Lafarge (company) (Euronext stock symbol LG)
 Lawrence Graham, a London-headquartered firm of business lawyers
 Lietuvos Geležinkeliai, the Lithuanian state railway company
 Luxair, the flag carrier airline of Luxembourg (IATA code LG)
Luminosity Gaming, a Canadian esports organisation

Science and mathematics
 Lateral giant interneuron, an interneuron in crayfish
 Binary logarithm, with base 2
 Common logarithm, with base 10
 Liouville–Green method, another name for the WKB approximation

Other uses
 LG, post-nominal letters used to signify a Lady Companion of the Order of the Garter
 Luganda language (ISO 639-1 language code)
 LG is commonly used as an abbreviation of Pokémon LeafGreen